The 2016–17 Siena Saints men's basketball team represented Siena College during the 2016–17 NCAA Division I men's basketball season. The Saints, led by fourth year head coach Jimmy Patsos, played their home games at the Times Union Center, with one exhibition game at Alumni Recreation Center, as members of the Metro Atlantic Athletic Conference. They finished the season 17–17, 12–8 in MAAC play to finish in a tie for third place. They defeated Fairfield and Monmouth before losing in the championship game of the MAAC tournament to Iona.

Roster

Schedule and results

|-
!colspan=9 style=| Exhibition

|-
!colspan=9 style=| Regular season

|-
!colspan=9 style="background:#; color:white;"| MAAC tournament

References

Siena Saints men's basketball seasons
Siena